The second season of King of the Nerds aired on TBS from January 23, 2014 to March 13, 2014. Inspired by the Revenge of the Nerds films, the season was hosted by actors and executive producers Robert Carradine and Curtis Armstrong, known for their roles as Lewis Skolnick and Dudley "Booger" Dawson, respectively, in Revenge of the Nerds.

Contestants

Contestant progress

: Katie was switched from Team Titans of Rigel to Team Midas Touch Attack.
:  Teams were dissolved and Nerd Wars became individual challenges.
: The losers of the final Nerd War were automatically eliminated.
Key
 (WINNER) The contestant won the competition and was crowned "King of the Nerds".
 (RUNNER-UP) The contestant was the runner-up in the competition.
 (WIN) The contestant won the Nerd War and received immunity from elimination.
 (IN) The contestant lost the Nerd War, but was not selected to compete in the Nerd-Off.
 (RISK) The contestant won the Nerd-Off and escaped elimination.
 (OUT) The contestant lost the Nerd-Off and was eliminated from the competition.
Teams
 The contestant was a member of Team Titans of Rigel.
 The contestant was a member of Team Midas Touch Attack.

Episodes

References

External links
 
 

2014 American television seasons
Nerd culture